Red, White and Blues is an album by trumpeter Red Rodney which was recorded in 1978 and released on the Muse label.

Reception

The AllMusic review by Scott Yanow stated "the frontline is in fine form. It is surprising that the quintet mostly performs newer originals ... However, the music (which includes such colorful titles as "No Jive Line" and "Ode to a Potato Plant") is largely straight-ahead. An underrated set".

Track listing
 "It's the Samething Everywhere" (Richie Coles) – 5:04
 "Lolita's Theme" (Bernie Senensky) – 3:49
 "Red, White and Blues" (Robert Chudnick) – 7:22
 "Rodney Round Robin" (Roland Hanna) – 3:23
 "Little Red Shoes" (Charlie Parker) – 5:50
 "Smoke Gets in Your Eyes" (Jerome Kern, Otto Harbach) – 3:29
 "No Jive Line" (Senensky) – 4:07
 "Ode to a Potato Plant" (Hanna) – 6:14

Personnel
Red Rodney – trumpet
Richie Cole - alto saxophone
Roland Hanna – piano
Buster Williams – bass
Eddie Gladden – drums

References

Muse Records albums
Red Rodney albums
1978 albums